Xijinqiao Station is a station of Line 3, Suzhou Rail Transit. The station is located in Huqiu District, Suzhou. It has been in use since December 25, 2019; when Line 3 first opened to the public.

Upon completion of Line 8, expected September 2024, the station will act as one of 3 interchanged between the lines.

References 

Railway stations in Jiangsu
Suzhou Rail Transit stations
Railway stations in China opened in 2019